Edgars Siksna (born January 15, 1993) is a Latvian professional ice hockey defenceman. He is currently playing for HK Rīga in the MHL.

Playing career
Siksna started his professional career playing for Liepājas Metalurgs. In August 2013 Dinamo Rīga announced they had signed a contract with Siksna. He played his first KHL game on September 22, 2013 against Vityaz.

International
He participated at the 2012 World Junior Ice Hockey Championships as a member of the Latvia men's national junior ice hockey team.

References

External links

1993 births
Living people
Ice hockey people from Riga
Latvian ice hockey defencemen
HK Liepājas Metalurgs players
Dinamo Riga players
HK Riga players